Sven Paris (born December 17, 1980) is an Italian amateur boxer who competed in the light welterweight division at the 2000 Summer Olympics.

Olympic Games 
2000 (as a light welterweight)
Defeated Pongsak Rientuanthong (Thailand) 14-3
Defeated Kay Huste (Germany) 17-11
Lost to Mohamed Allalou (Algeria) 8-22

References

1980 births
People from Frosinone
Boxers at the 2000 Summer Olympics
Olympic boxers of Italy
Light-welterweight boxers
Living people
Italian male boxers
Sportspeople from the Province of Frosinone
21st-century Italian people